The Philippine Golf Tour, currently titled as the ICTSI Philippine Golf Tour for sponsorship reasons, is the main professional golf tour in the Philippines.

The tour was founded in 2009 and was created in order to further advance professional golf in the Philippines. Many players from the Philippine Golf Tour have progressed through the tour, eventually playing and winning on the Asian Tour. Notable players include Antonio Lascuña, Juvic Pagunsan, Angelo Que and Miguel Tabuena. Most notably, Korean-born Tom Kim; a multiple PGA Tour winner, started his career on the Philippine Golf Tour.

Since its inauguration, the tour has been title sponsored by Manila-based global port management company International Container Terminal Services (ICTSI). They have also title sponsored the majority of tournaments played on the tour.

PGT Asia
In August 2017, the Philippine Golf Tour launched a new circuit labelled as the PGT Asia, aimed at offering Asian players more playing opportunities in the region. The circuit ran until 2019.

PGT Asia Order of Merit winners

Order of Merit winners

References

External links

Professional golf tours
Golf in the Philippines